Luca Rizzo (born 24 April 1992) is an Italian professional footballer who plays as a midfielder.

Career

Sampdoria
A youth product of hometown club Sampdoria, Rizzo had spent 3 seasons on loan to lower divisions, for Lega Pro Prima Divisione clubs Pergocrema and Foligno in 2011–12 season; Pisa in 2012–13 season.

On 9 July 2013, he was spotted by Serie B club Modena in temporary deal with an option to co-own the player. Modena exercised the option after a successful season, however Sampdoria also exercised the counter-option.

Bologna
On 30 June 2015, Rizzo joined Serie A newcomers Bologna in a temporary deal with an obligation to buy at the end of season, for €5.240 million.

On 31 January 2019, he joined Carpi on loan.

On 9 August 2019, he joined Livorno on loan.

Pro Vercelli
After not playing in the first half of the 2020–21 season, on 27 January 2021 he signed with Serie C club Pro Vercelli.

References

External links
 AIC profile (data by football.it) 
 Lega Serie A profile 
 

Living people
1992 births
Footballers from Genoa
Italian footballers
Association football midfielders
Serie A players
Serie B players
Serie C players
U.C. Sampdoria players
U.S. Pergolettese 1932 players
A.S.D. Città di Foligno 1928 players
Pisa S.C. players
Modena F.C. players
Bologna F.C. 1909 players
S.P.A.L. players
Atalanta B.C. players
Calcio Foggia 1920 players
A.C. Carpi players
U.S. Livorno 1915 players
F.C. Pro Vercelli 1892 players